Hymenobacter rigui  is a Gram-negative, rod-shaped and non-motile bacterium from the genus of Hymenobacter which has been isolated from water from the Woopo wetland in Korea.

References 

rigui
Bacteria described in 2006